Anna Rokita (born 30 January 1986) is an Austrian long track speed skater who participates in international competitions. She is the daughter of Polish speed skater Jerzy Rokita.

Personal records

Career highlights

Olympic Winter Games
2006 – Torino, 16th at 3000 m
2006 – Torino, 27th at 1500 m
2006 – Torino, 12th at 5000 m
World Allround Championships
2006 – Calgary, 22nd
World Single Distance Championships
2005 – Inzell, 20th at 1500 m
2005 – Inzell, 17th at 3000 m
European Allround Championships
2005 – Heerenveen, 15th
2006 – Hamar, 15th
2007 – Collalbo, 15th
2008 – Kolomna,  15th
World Junior Allround Championships
2001 – Groningen, 24th
2002 – Collalbo, 13th
2003 – Kushiro, 5th
2004 – Roseville, Minnesota, 18th
2005 – Seinäjoki, 8th
National Championships
2001 – Innsbruck,  3rd at allround
2003 – Innsbruck,  2nd at allround
2003 – Innsbruck,  1st at sprint
2004 – Inzell,  1st at allround
2004 – Collalbo,  1st at sprint
2005 – Innsbruck,  1st at sprint
Nordic Junior Games
2004 – Berlin,  3rd at 1000 m
Winter Universiade
2005 – Innsbruck,  2nd at 5000 m

External links
Rokita at Jakub Majerski's Speedskating Database
Rokita at SkateResults.com

1986 births
Living people
Austrian female speed skaters
Austrian people of Polish descent
Speed skaters at the 2006 Winter Olympics
Speed skaters at the 2010 Winter Olympics
Speed skaters at the 2014 Winter Olympics
Olympic speed skaters of Austria
Sportspeople from Innsbruck
Universiade medalists in speed skating
Universiade gold medalists for Austria
Competitors at the 2005 Winter Universiade
Speed skaters at the 2007 Winter Universiade
Medalists at the 2007 Winter Universiade